The Sri Srinivasa Perumal Temple in Kudavasal, Tamil Nadu, India is a Hindu temple dedicated to Lord Srinivasa, a form of Lord Vishnu. Kudavasal is a small town located in the Thiruvarur district, in between two distributaries of Cauvery river, Kudamurutti and Chola Choodamani. Lord Srinivasa appears with his consorts Sridevi and Bhoomadevi. Kudavasal temple's speciality is that it has the only north-facing sanctum of Lord Srinivasa in the World.

The temple
Srinivasa Perumal Temple at Kudavasal is more than 400 years old. Kudavasal used to be a home for many Vedic Pandits and Scholars, who offered their daily prayers to "Lord Srinivasa" and conducted a variety of Utsavams in a grand manner including "Brahmothsavam" for ages. This holy Temple witnessed several spiritual events including the most venerated "Soma Yagam" performed by great scholars like Shri. U. Ve. Agnihotram Ramanuja Tatachariar and Shri. U. Ve. Siddhanna Sundaram Thathachariar. The temple follows the traditional Vadakalai sect of Iyengars.

The temple was established by Maharajah Krishnadevaraya of the Vijayanagara empire between the years 1509 to 1529 CE. It is believed that Lord Srinivasa appeared in the Maharaja's dream as an old man with the news that there is an idol buried at a certain location and has to face north to serve as younger brother of Tirumalai Venkateswara. The Maharaja personally used a golden plough at the location the very next day and the idol was miraculously dug out just like in his dream. The Maharaja bequeathed vast amount of lands to the temple. A scholarly Brahmin community was established near the temple for its upkeep.

However, with the exodus of the community shifting their place of residence to cities, and with efflux of time, the Temple did not receive adequate attention and proper maintenance. Further, the income from the properties that the Temple enjoyed started dwindling. The last Samprokshanam to the Temple was performed in 1996 by the Board of Trustees with the help of Kudavasal Srinivasa Perumal Seva Samithi. During this renovation, the Temple Quarters was also rebuilt and a new ‘Transit House’ with basic amenities was constructed for the convenience of the sevarthis from outstations.

Unfortunately, the beautiful Uthsava Murthis were stolen and with great efforts by the Board of Trustees, they were recovered subsequently. Thereafter, the Board of Trustees as well as the Kudavasal Srinivasa Perumal Seva Samithi took several steps to improve the security arrangements in the Temple. Thanks to these measures and perseverance, the Idols could be brought back to their original abode recently. Now, there is a proposal to conduct Samprokshanam afresh for the temple in view of last Samprokshanam was held in the year 1996. Efforts started with the Balalayam performed on 8 and 9 July 2008. The Maha kumbabhishekam was performed on 21 March 2009.

Notes

Religious buildings and structures completed in 1529
Vishnu temples in Tiruvarur district